Stefan Pieper (born 1 April 1982) is a retired German ski jumper.

In the World Cup he finished once among the top 15, his best result being a seventh place from Sapporo in January 2003.

External links

1982 births
Living people
People from Winterberg
Sportspeople from Arnsberg (region)
German male ski jumpers